Tamuri Slim Wigness Jr is an Australian professional basketball player who last played for the North Gold Coast Seahawks of the NBL1 North.

Early life
Wigness was born in the Torres Strait Islands region of Queensland, Australia and is of Indigenous Australian heritage (Muralag). He moved with his family to Cairns, Queensland at an early age to begin his primary schooling education. His first sporting interest began to develop while in Cairns when he played junior rugby league up until the age of 10 when his mother advised him to play basketball instead because it involved less contact. Within a year of picking up the sport, Wigness was placed in Cairns Basketball's Tiny Taipans development program and was given the opportunity to train with professional Cairns Taipans players at the age of 11.

Wigness attended Cairns State High School throughout his teenage years and while in high school he continued to play basketball as well as picking up junior Australian rules football with the Manunda Hawks in the local AFL Cairns competition where he was selected to play for multiple junior representative teams. He and fellow Cairns junior basketball standout Alex Davies were both scouted by the professional Gold Coast Suns AFL team throughout their teenage years and were offered places in the Suns' developmental academy; Davies accepted the offer to pursue football while Wigness elected to focus on basketball. The pair remain close friends and often train together in both sports when based in the same area.

At 14 years of age, Wigness was chosen to represent his home state of Queensland at the 2016 under-16 national championships and starred throughout the tournament scoring an average of 25.56 points per game, with a 45-point highlight coming against South Australia. He accepted an NBA Global Academy scholarship in 2017 and was given access to first class training facilities at the Australian Institute of Sport complex in Canberra. Later that year he was once again chosen to represent Queensland at the under-16 national championships and his dominant performances for Queensland led to selection for the Australian team at the 2017 FIBA Under-16 Asian Championship. He played a pivotal role in winning the gold medal for Australia and was named as the starting point guard in the All-Tournament Team. In 2018 he travelled to Treviso, Italy to take part in the NBA's Global Camp where he impressed scouts by forming an athletic backcourt combination with fellow Australian guard Josh Green.

Wigness was also a part of the gold medal-winning Australian teams at the 2018 FIBA Under-18 Asian Championship and the 2019 FIBA Oceania Under-18 Championship as well as competing for his home nation at the 2018 FIBA Under-17 Basketball World Cup and the 2019 FIBA Under-19 Basketball World Cup.

Between 2017 and 2020, Wigness attended and played for the Basketball Australia Centre of Excellence in the SEABL, NBL1 and Waratah League. In the 2019 NBL1 season, he averaged 11.7 points, four assists and 3.4 rebounds per game. In his season finale, he posted 22 points and 12 assists. Wigness was put on the radar of several college and NBA scouts when he travelled to Charlotte, North Carolina to compete in the 2019 Basketball Without Borders Global Camp and walked away with All-Tournament honours.

In 2020, Wigness played for the Southern Districts Spartans in the Queensland State League (QSL).

Professional career
On 20 July 2020, Wigness announced his decision to forego the American college system and instead signed a two-year contract with the Brisbane Bullets of the National Basketball League (NBL) as a part of their Next Stars program. He played 44 games for the Bullets over two seasons.

During the 2021 off-season, Wigness had a short stint with the Brisbane Capitals in the NBL1 North. In 2022, he played for the North Gold Coast Seahawks in the NBL1 North.

National team career
Wigness has represented Australia in several junior international tournaments, including at the 2019 FIBA Under-19 Basketball World Cup and the 2018 FIBA Under-17 Basketball World Cup. At the 2019 Under 17 FIBA Oceania Championship, he made the All-Star Five.

References

2002 births
Living people
Australian men's basketball players
Brisbane Bullets players
Indigenous Australian basketball players
Point guards
Sportsmen from Queensland
Torres Strait Islanders